Agathotoma camarina is a species of sea snail, a marine gastropod mollusk in the family Mangeliidae.

Description
The length of the shell attains 6 mm, its diameter 2.5 mm.

(Original description) The small, white shell has a hexagonal shape. The  blunt glassy protoconch consists of  whorls. The teleoconch contains about five subsequent whorls. The surface shows no spiral sculpture under a hand lens. The axial sculpture consists of six strong rounded ribs, running the whole length of the shell and continuous over the spire. The suture is distinct. The aperture is narrow, with a relatively large rounded anal sulcus, a thickened outer lip without internal liration.  The inner lip is simple not callous. The columella is short. The siphonal canal is hardly differentiated.

Distribution
This marine species occurs off the Galápagos Islands.

References

  Bouchet P., Kantor Yu.I., Sysoev A. & Puillandre N. (2011) A new operational classification of the Conoidea. Journal of Molluscan Studies 77: 273-308. 
  Tucker, J.K. 2004 Catalog of recent and fossil turrids (Mollusca: Gastropoda). Zootaxa 682:1-1295.

External links
 

camarina
Gastropods described in 1919